"50/50 & Lullaby" is a double A-side single from British R&B singer Lemar. It is his third single and the second single from his debut album, Dedicated (2003). "50/50" contained a sample of Jay-Z's "Can't Knock the Hustle" while "Lullaby" was a track co-written with fellow Fame Academy contestant Ainslie Henderson. The single became Lemar's second top-five hit in the United Kingdom, peaking at number five there in November 2003. It also reached number 49 in Ireland the same month.

Track listings
CD 1
 "50/50"
 "Lullaby"
 "50/50" (Blacksmith R&B Rub) (featuring Jahzell)
 "50/50" (Enhanced Video)

CD 2
 "Let's Stay Together"
 "Lullaby" (featuring Ainslie Henderson) (Acoustic Version)
 "50/50" (Kings of Soul Vocal Mix)

12-inch vinyl
 "50/50"
 "50/50" (Blacksmith R&B Rub) (featuring Jahzell)
 "50/50" (Kings of Soul Vocal Mix)

Charts

Weekly charts

Year-end charts

References

2003 singles
2003 songs
Lemar songs
Song recordings produced by Stargate (record producers)
Songs written by Ainslie Henderson
Songs written by Lemar
Songs written by Mikkel Storleer Eriksen
Songs written by Tor Erik Hermansen
Sony Music UK singles